Modern Farmer may refer to:

 Modern Farmer (magazine), an American magazine
 Modern Farmer (TV series), a 2014 Korean TV series
The Modern Farmer, an African American agricultural publication